CCDM may refer to:

 Control of Communicable Diseases Manual
 Catalog of Components of Double and Multiple Stars
 Collisionless cold dark matter